Hersende of Champagné (1060 – 1 December 1114) was the founder and first Abbess of Fontevraud Abbey.

Biography
Hersende was born in Anjou to a noble French family in or after 1060. Hersende had been married twice and widowed twice. She became a disciple of Robert of Arbrissel. Hersende persuaded her step-son, Gautier of Montsoreau, to provide her with the land to found the abbey. Robert was a believer in double monasteries, which considered of separate quarters of men and women under the management of the Abbess. Hersende became the first Abbess of the Abbey of Fontevraud, overseeing the construction of the abbey herself. This was the Motherhouse of the Order of Fontevraud. Hersende died in Fontevraud Abbey.>

It has been postulated that Hersande may be the mother of Héloïse, wife and lover of Abelard.

Sources

1060 births
1114 deaths
People from Anjou
11th-century French nuns
French Roman Catholic abbesses
Order of Fontevraud